The Women's snowboard slopestyle competition at the FIS Freestyle Ski and Snowboarding World Championships 2021 was held on 12 March. A qualification was held on 10 March 2021.

Qualification
The qualification was started on 10 March at 10:45. The eight best snowboarders qualified for the final.

Final
The final was started at 09:30.

References

Women's snowboard slopestyle